Euphrasia parviflora is a species of flowering plant belonging to the family Orobanchaceae.

Synonym:
 Euphrasia curta subsp. glabrescens Smejkal
 Euphrasia officinalis f. curta Fr.

References

parviflora